Edna Veiga  (born ) is a retired Brazilian female volleyball player. 

She was part of the Brazil women's national volleyball team at the 1994 FIVB Volleyball Women's World Championship in Brazil. On club level she played with Nossa Caia/Recreativa.

Clubs
 Sport Clube Juíz de Fora (1984/1985)
 Transbrasil/Pinheiros (1986/1987)
 Minas Tênis Clube (1987/1988-1990/1991-1997/1998)
 Supergasbras (1988/1989/1990)
 Matita Rosso e Blu Napoli (1991/1992) 
 Toshiba Albamotor Cassano - Itália (1992/1993)[2]
 Nossa Caixa /Recreativa (1993/1994/1995)
 Leite Moça-Leite Nestlè (1995/1996/71997)
 Cimed/Macaé (1998/1999)

References

1964 births
Living people
Brazilian women's volleyball players
Place of birth missing (living people)
Expatriate volleyball players in Italy
Brazilian expatriates in Italy
Brazilian expatriate sportspeople
Sportspeople from Alagoas